Bokhorst-Wankendorf is an Amt ("collective municipality") in the district of Plön, in Schleswig-Holstein, Germany. Its seat is in Wankendorf. It was formed on 1 January 2008 from the former Ämter Bokhorst and Wankendorf.

The Amt Bokhorst-Wankendorf consists of the following municipalities:

Belau 
Großharrie 
Rendswühren
Ruhwinkel 
Schillsdorf
Stolpe 
Tasdorf 
Wankendorf

References

Ämter in Schleswig-Holstein